Bethesda is an unincorporated community in Chatham County, in the U.S. state of Georgia.

History
The community took its name from an orphanage, now known as Bethesda Academy, established at the site.

References

Unincorporated communities in Chatham County, Georgia
Unincorporated communities in Georgia (U.S. state)